Kandhari is an Indian (Khatri) toponymic surname indicating association with Kandahar, Afghanistan. Notable people with the name include:

 Harjeev Kandhari (born 1975), Indian entrepreneur
 Karan Kandhari, Indian film director
 LK Kandhari (1931–1971), Indian cricketer
 Rishina Kandhari, Indian TV actress

Other uses 
 Red Kandhari, breed of cattle native to Kandhar, Maharashtra, India
 Burj Kandhari, village in Punjab, India

See also 
 Qandhari, a region in Pakistan
 Kandahari (disambiguation)
 Kandari (disambiguation)
 Gandhari (disambiguation)

References

Toponymic surnames
Indian surnames
Surnames of Indian origin
People from Kandahar
Khatri clans
Khatri surnames
Hindu surnames
Punjabi-language surnames